The 1968 Federation Cup was the sixth edition of what is now known as the Fed Cup. 23 nations participated in the tournament, which was held at Stade Roland Garros in Paris, France, from 21–26 May. Australia defeated the Netherlands in the final, in what was the first final not featuring United States, giving Australia their third title.

Participating Teams

Draw
All ties were played at Stade Roland Garros in Paris, France on clay courts.

First round
Czechoslovakia vs. Norway

Great Britain vs. Sweden

Soviet Union vs. Belgium

Italy vs. Mexico

Netherlands vs. Finland

Poland vs. Greece

Bulgaria vs. Chile

Second round
Australia vs. Brazil

South Africa vs. Canada

Czechoslovakia vs. Great Britain

Soviet Union vs. Italy

Netherlands vs. Poland

France vs. Portugal

Switzerland vs. United States

Quarterfinals
Australia vs. South Africa

Great Britain vs. Soviet Union

Netherlands vs. Bulgaria

France vs. United States

Semifinals
Australia vs. Great Britain

 The doubles rubber for this tie holds the Fed Cup record for the most games (pre-tiebreak), with 51

Netherlands vs. United States

Final
Australia vs. Netherlands

References

Billie Jean King Cups by year
Federation Cup
Federation Cup
Federation Cup
Federation Cup
Federation Cup
Federation Cup
Federation Cup